Eddie Alexander Ávila Ortiz (born April 26, 1977), originally known by his stage name Eddie Dee, is a Puerto Rican hip hop recording artist, lyricist and dancer. He began his career in 1990 and launched his debut studio album three years later. He became one of the more popular Urban artists from Puerto Rico after appearing on DJ Adam's Mad Jam vol. 2 in 1997. It featured the hit single "Señor Official". His following releases El Terrorista de la Lírica (2000) and Biografía (2001), too enjoyed underground success. The 2004 album 12 Discípulos is regarded as "the greatest reggaetón various artist album of all time". The album features songs by some of the most successful reggaetón artist, including the intro of the album, where they all come together as one to show that "unity is needed for the genre reggaetón to survive and evolve". It was a collaboration between eleven other artist including Daddy Yankee, Tego Calderón, Ivy Queen, and Vico C among others, who were among the most requested at the time. The track, known as "Los 12 Discípulos" or "Quítate Tu Pa' Ponerme Yo" reached number eight on the Billboard Tropical Songs chart, and was nominated for a 2005 Billboard Latin Music Award for "Tropical Airplay Track of the Year, New Artist". The album itself reached number one on the Billboard Tropical Albums chart for three nonconsecutive weeks.  Though retired since 2015, Eddie Dee is generally regarded within the worldwide Reggaeton and Spanish Hip Hop Communities as one of its most important and influential figures alongside the likes of Daddy Yankee, Vico C, Tego Calderón and Ivy Queen.  Tagwut is actually an album by DJ Black (frequent collaborator of Playero DJ), not Eddie Dee but he appears in it performing one of his hits 'Directamente Del Ghetto'.

Musical career

1990–2004: Beginning and rise to fame 
Eddie Dee was born Eddie Alexander Ávila Ortiz on April 26, 1977 to his mother Diomaris Ortiz and father Eddie Ávila. He began singing and composing songs at an early age before beginning his musical career in 1990, when he started to appear on television shows. His first encounter with fame was in 1987 when he was already famous in his neighbourhood because of his rapping. In 1991 he was one of the dancers in the Puerto Rican propaganda El Sida Está Cañón, led by the singer Ernesto Morales, a message to prevent AIDS. In 1993, he released his debut album Eddie & The Ghetto Crew. Following the album, he began gaining popularity within Puerto Rico by collaborating with other artists. In 1994 Eddie participated on a music video for Straight From The Ghetto, a mixtape by the producer DJ Guichy, being Edde's first participation on a music video. Eddie Dee became popular with the 1997 single "Señor Oficial," from DJ Adam's Compilation album Mad Jam vol. 2 'The Comeback', which detailed "the injustices that young Puerto Rican men suffered at the hands of the police." It was a commercial success reaching number one in Puerto Rico. The album gained him a "Puerto Rican Rap and Reggae Award for Best Lyrics" the same year.  Around this time as well, Eddie Dee participated in successful compilation albums from the Puerto Rican Hip Hop/Reggaeton scene such as 'Boricua Guerrero' and El Cartel de Yankee with the latter containing the successful single "¿Porque?".  In 1999 he helped a new rapper by supporting his work and recording with him on the song "En Peligro De Extinción", which was part of the track list of his next studio album: El Terrorista De La Lírica (which also includes the posthumous appearance of Frankie Ruiz, a famous American salsa singer, who died in 1998). That rapper was Tego Calderón at his very early beginning in the music industry, and in 2003 he gained international popularity after his first studio album, El Abayarde, which sold 300.000 copies worldwide.  Before the official release of "El Terrorista De La Lirica", Eddie Dee released the maxi-single "Amor Mio" containing a collaboration with Puerto Rican Reggae band Cultura Profética, two remixes, one by Nico Canada and another featuring Angel Lopez of Son by Four fame plus the song "Asi Yo Vivo" which was included on his 2nd album along with the Angel version.

2004–06: 12 Discípulos international success 

He experienced underground success with his following two releases El Terrorista de la Lírica (2000) and Biografía (2001). In 2004, Dee launched 12 Discípulos which reached number one on the Billboard Tropical Albums chart for three nonconsecutive weeks. It also reached number five on the Billboard Latin Albums chart. "Cuando Es/Wao" was released as the lead single. The title track, "Los 12 Discípulos" was released as the second single and reached number eight on the Billboard Tropical Songs chart. It was nominated for a 2005 Billboard Latin Music Award for "Tropical Airplay Track of the Year, New Artist". It featured Daddy Yankee, Ivy Queen, Tego Calderón, Voltio, Vico C, Zion, Lennox, Nicky Jam, Johnny Prez, Gallego, and Wiso G. Also in 2004, Dee co-wrote Daddy Yankee's super-hit "Gasolina" from his 2004 album Barrio Fino which became a commercial success in the United States and introduced reggaeton to American, European, Asian, and African audiences, alongside Ivy Queen's Diva and Real and Tego Calderón's El Enemy de los Guasibiri.<ref>Carney Smith, Jessie. [https://books.google.com/books?id=10rEGSIItjgC&q=Ivy+Queen+Diva%27%27Encyclopedia&pg=PA1199 of African American Popular Culture] . ABC-CLIO, 2010, p. 1199.</ref> A year later was released a special edition for 12 Discípulos, which included a remix version of La Secta's "La Locura Automática" and the single "El Taladro" featuring Daddy Yankee, song that reached the No. 22 position in Billboards Latin Tropical Airplay charts. According to the American Society of Composers, Authors and Publishers, he is "your rapper's favorite rapper".

 2006–present: El Diario and musical inactivity 
In 2005 was announced his next studio album: El Diario, which was going to be released in November 2007. In that year was released a 10 track-long free mixtape titled The Final Countdown, but El Diario wasn't released. In 2009 was announced another mixtape: 180 Grados and Eddie said that his studio album was going to be released, and also said that it wasn't published in 2007 because he wasn't sure of his album quality as to music. Neither El Diario and 180 Grados have been released, but both also haven’t been confirmed to be canceled. His work has been decreased after El Diario's postponement, releasing just two singles between 2009 and 2010, writing Jowell & Randy's "Un Cambio" in 2010 and Plan B's "Te Dijeron" for Pina Records' La Fórmula in 2012, and collaborating in Alexis & Fido's "La Trampa" (2011) and Wisin's remix of "Sistema" (2013), which was his last participation in a song, either being him as principal or guest artist.

After two years of public inactivity, Eddie Dee appeared as a guest artist in Tego Calderón's La Trayectoria concert in the famous Puerto Rican Coliseum, performing "Los 12 Discípulos", "En Peligro De Extinción", and "El Bueno, El Malo Y El Feo" alongside Calderón and Vico C.

 Discography 

Studio albums
 1993: Eddie Dee & The Ghetto Crew 
 1998:  "Amor Mio EP" 
 2000: El Terrorista De La Lírica 
 TBA: El DiarioMixtapes
 2007: The Final Countdown TBA: 180 GradosCompilation albums
 2004: 12 DiscípulosGreatest hits albums
 2001: Biografía 2009: Oro Reggaetonero: 20 Éxitos''

Awards and nominations 

|-
|align="center"|1997
|"Señor Oficial"
|Puerto Rican Rap and Reggae Award for Best Lyrics
|
|-
|align="center" rowspan="2"|1998
|rowspan="2"|"Amor Mío"
|Puerto Rican Rap and Reggae Award for Best Song
|
|-
|Puerto Rican Rap and Reggae Award for Best Lyrics
|
|-
|align="center" rowspan="2"|2005
|"Los 12 Discípulos"Joint nomination with Gallego, Vico C, Tego Calderón, Ivy Queen, Julio Voltio, Daddy Yankee, Zion & Lennox, Johnny Prez, Nicky Jam and Wiso G
|Billboard Latin Music Award for Tropical Airplay Track of the Year, New Artist
|
|-
|"Gasolina"Joint nomination with Daddy Yankee and Luny Tunes
|Latin Grammy Award for Record of the Year (as songwriter)
|
|}

References 

1977 births
21st-century American male actors
Living people
People from Río Piedras, Puerto Rico
21st-century Puerto Rican male singers
20th-century Puerto Rican male singers
Puerto Rican reggaeton musicians
Machete Music artists